The Battle for Midway is a turn-based strategy video game developed and published by Personal Software Services. It was first released in the United Kingdom and France for the MSX in 1984, and was re-released for the Amstrad CPC, Commodore 64 and ZX Spectrum in 1985. It is the second instalment of the Strategic Wargames series. The game is set during the Battle of Midway in the Pacific Ocean theatre of World War II and revolves around the United States Navy attacking a large Imperial Japanese fleet stationed at Midway Atoll, in retaliation for the attack on Pearl Harbor.

In the game, the player assumes control of American forces and must eliminate all Japanese forces around the atoll by air or naval combat. The Battle for Midway received largely negative reviews upon release. It was criticised for its incompatibility with black and white television sets, as the game was only accessible in a limited range of colours. The easy difficulty of the gameplay was also criticised.

Gameplay

The game is a turn-based strategy and focuses on naval battles during the Battle of Midway, which is initiated in response to the Japanese attack on Pearl Harbor. The player commands three American task forces; two United States Navy forces and one United States Air Force unit, which are stationed on Midway Atoll. The objective of the game is to defeat three attacking Imperial Japanese naval forces. Each American task force has an aircraft carrier, whereas the Japanese have four. The player begins the game with two American search aircraft used to locate and track the attacking Japanese forces.

When the main attacking Japanese force has been located, the player must send all available air units to engage them in combat. Air combat takes place over real time, and may take up to a minute of travel time once launched from an aircraft carrier. Aircraft will run out of fuel over time and will crash if not refuelled at a carrier. The game contains elements of arcade gameplay, which will automatically enable once the player comes into contact with the enemy. The arcade sequences involves the player utilising an anti-air machine gun in order to shoot down Japanese aircraft. The game ends once all four Japanese aircraft carriers have been destroyed.

Background and release
Personal Software Services was founded in Coventry, England, by Gary Mays and Richard Cockayne in 1981. The company was known for creating games that featured historic war battles and conflicts, such as Theatre Europe, Bismark and Falklands '82. The company had a partnership with French video game developer ERE Informatique, and published localised versions of their products to the United Kingdom. In 1986, Cockayne took a decision to alter their products for release on 16-bit machines, as he found that smaller 8-bit computers, such as the ZX Spectrum, lacked the processing power for larger strategy games. The decision was falsely interpreted as "pulling out" from the Spectrum market by video game journalist Phillipa Irving. Following years of successful sales throughout the mid 1980s, Personal Software Services experienced financial difficulties, in what Cockayne admitted in a retrospective interview that "he took his eye off the ball". The company was acquired by Mirrorsoft in February 1987, and was later dispossessed by the company due to strains of debt.

Upon release, The Battle for Midway was packaged with an exclusive ring-binder and a manual detailing the nature of the Battle of Midway. It was later re-released as part of a Strategic Wargames compilation cassette known as Conflicts 2, published by Personal Software Services.

Reception

The game received negative reviews upon release. Angus Ryall of Crash criticised the game's incompatibility with black and white television sets, stating that, despite a growing British economy, Ryall expected the developers to have designed games for "the lowest common denominator". Gwyn Hughes of Your Sinclair criticised the tactical elements of the game as too light, stating that the success of the player depends on dexterity, and not "brainpower". Clare Edgely of Sinclair User praised the game's historical accuracy, however she felt that its late release in comparison to other wargames made The Battle for Midway feel "ordinary". A reviewer of Your Computer stated that the game was a "flawed" attempt to recreate the famous Battle of Midway, despite admitting that it contained "some nice touches". A reviewer of Australian Commodore Review praised the game's wide range of features such as the save and load functions. However, they criticised menu designs and "insufficiently integrated" arcade sequences, calling them both "poor".

Two reviewers of Your Spectrum criticised the combat sequences' reliance on the speed of pressing keys instead of the use of strategy. One reviewer considered the game to be sophisticated, however the other reviewer viewed the game's slow pace and graphics negatively. Despite the criticism, Ryall praised the real time element of the game and accessibility, saying that The Battle for Midway is up to "current standards". A reviewer of Amstrad Action praised the game's "accurate" reproduction of events and different levels of speed, however criticised the easy predictability of Japanese forces. A reviewer of Amtix stated that the game suffered from "average" graphics and "poor" sound, and also questioned the inclusion of the arcade sequences. A reviewer of Your 64 recommended The Battle for Midway for beginners to the genre, despite stating that it was "not a simple game". A reviewer of Commodore Horizons called it an "enthralling" game.

References

1984 video games
MSX games
ZX Spectrum games
Amstrad CPC games
Commodore 64 games
Single-player video games
Turn-based strategy video games
Video games developed in the United Kingdom
World War II video games
Personal Software Services games
Aircraft carriers in fiction